Glycon ( Glýkōn, :  Glýkōnos), also spelled Glykon, was an ancient snake god. He had a large and influential cult within the Roman Empire in the 2nd century, with contemporary satirist Lucian providing the primary literary reference to the deity. Lucian claimed Glycon was created in the mid-2nd century by the Greek prophet Alexander of Abonoteichos. Lucian was ill-disposed toward the cult, calling Alexander a false prophet and accusing the whole enterprise of being a hoax: Glycon himself was supposedly a hand puppet.

Macedonian cultural roots
The cult possibly originated in Macedonia, where similar snake cults had existed for centuries. The Macedonians believed snakes had magical powers relating to fertility and had a rich mythology on this subject, for example the story of Olympias's impregnation by Zeus disguised as a serpent.

Early years
At least initially, the cult did not worship an abstraction or a spirit of a snake but an actual, physical serpent that was said to embody the god. According to the cult's mythology, the snake appeared after Alexander had foretold the coming of a new incarnation of Asclepius. When the people gathered in the marketplace of Abonutichus at noon, when the incarnation was supposed to occur, Alexander produced a goose egg and sliced it open, revealing the god within. Within a week it grew to the size of a man with the features of a man on its face, including long blond hair. At this point the figure resembling this description was apparently a puppet that appeared in the temple. In some references Glycon was a trained snake with a puppet head.

As with previous Macedonian snake cults, the focus of worship at the temple was on fertility. Barren women would bring offerings to Glycon in hopes of becoming pregnant. According to Lucian, Alexander had less magical ways of causing pregnancy among his flock as well.

Spread and influence

By 160, the worship of Glycon had undoubtedly spread beyond the Aegean. An inscription from Antioch of that date records a slogan, "Glycon protect us from the plague-cloud" that is consistent with the description we have from Lucian. Also in that year the governor of Asia, Publius Mummius Sisenna Rutilianus, declared himself protector of Glycon's oracle. The governor later married Alexander's daughter. According to Lucian, another Roman governor, of Cappadocia, was led by Glycon's oracle to his death in Armenia, and even the Emperor himself was not immune to the cult: Marcus Aurelius sought prophesies from Alexander and his snake god.

Meanwhile, Abonoteichos, a small fishing village before the arrival of the cult, became an important town and accepted another name, Ionopolis. It is uncertain what role the popularity of Glycon played in the rise of the city.

As the cult had an established popularity with the lower social strata, and later several important Roman functionaries and officials were counted among the believers in Glycon and the prophecies of Alexander,  including the Emperor at the time, Marcus Aurelius. Such endorsement by the ruling classes coupled with pre existing superstitions of serpents as possessing healing powers, the cult of Glycon likely found no shortage of converts and adherents in new areas of the Roman world.

In short order Glycon worship was found throughout the vast area between the Danube and Euphrates. Beginning late in the reign of Antoninus Pius and continuing into the 3rd century, official Roman coins were struck in honor of Glycon, attesting his popularity. The Roman currency bearing the image of Glycon is known to have been in active circulation during 3rd century AD,  however it is unknown if some of them were produced in this time period or if they remained in use after being produced earlier, during Alexander's life (c.105-c.170).

It is known that for at least a hundred years following Alexander's death a new Glycon cult began to spread its influence along areas adjacent to the Danube, with archaeological finds such as the statue discovered in Tomi (modern day Constanța) being interpreted by some to indicate the presence of a large public cult in the city.

While the cult gradually lost followers after the death of its leader in c.170, it survived for at least a hundred years thereafter, with Alexander being incorporated into its mythology as a grandson of Asclepius. Given the prominence of snake cults as healing divinities in the Mediterranean and surrounding areas, both before and after the rise of Glycon in the region, the spread of the cult continued for some time following the death of Alexander. Some evidence indicates the cult survived into the 4th century. As the contemporary works of Lucian are the primary written reference to Glycon, its cult and their activities, what became of them exactly is unclear following the death of Alexander of Abonoteichos, due to lack of written record.

Modern times

A marble statue of Glycon was found during an excavation under the former Pallas railway station in Constanța, Romania. It is on display at the Constanța History and Archaeology Museum. Romania commemorated this unique sculpture on a postage stamp in 1974, and on a bank note of 10,000 lei in 1994.

Having declared himself a ceremonial magician in 1993, the English comic book writer and occultist Alan Moore later described himself as a devotee of Glycon, preferring the belief in a hoax deity "because [he is] not likely to start believing that glove puppet created the universe or anything dangerous like that."

See also
Serpent (symbolism)

Notes

References
A.M. Harmon, Introduction to Lucian of Samosata
Greek text of Lucian: Alexander or the False Prophet, with modern Greek translation by A.M. Harmon, 1925

C.P. Jones, Culture and Society in Lucian (1986)
M.S. Kos, "Draco and the survival of the snake cult in the central Balkans", in: Tyche 6 (1991)
R. Lane Fox, Pagans and Christians in the Mediterranean World (1986)
Wolk, Douglas, Please, Sir, I Want Some Moore: The lazy British genius who transformed American comics(2003)
Wilson, Rainn, The Bassoon King: my life in art, faith, and idiocy (2015)

External links
 Alan Moore's alternative Thought for the Day – on BBC Radio 4's Today programme
 The Worship of the Serpent – Chapter 1: Serpent Worship in Asia by John Bathurst Deane 1833

 
Roman gods
Snake gods